Hakuyo Maru (Japanese: 白鷹丸) was a Japanese cargo ship of during World War II.

History
She was launched October 1942 at the Osaka shipyard of Ohara Shipbuilding & Steel Works for the benefit of shipping company Kyushu Yusen Co., Ltd. (jp: 九州郵船), Fukuoka and completed in 1943.

References

1942 ships
Ships built in Japan
Maritime incidents in June 1945
Ships sunk by American submarines